Bakaly (Baqalı) is a rural locality (a village) in Kashkalevsky Selsoviet, Burayevsky District, Bashkortostan, Russia. The population was 195 as of 2010. There are 6 streets.

Geography 
Bakaly is located 23 km east of Burayevo (the district's administrative centre) by road. Kashkalevo is the nearest rural locality.

References 

Rural localities in Burayevsky District